Opti may refer to
OPTi Inc., a manufacturer of computer components
Daihatsu Opti, a car
OPTI Canada, an oil company
Optimist (dinghy), a type of boat
OptiRTC, a software company